Behaviour (released as Behavior in the United States) is the fourth studio album by English synth-pop duo Pet Shop Boys, released on 22 October 1990 by Parlophone. A Japanese special edition included a bonus mini CD, exclusive artwork and printed lyrics in a white velvet-like box.

Background
Harold Faltermeyer produced Behaviour at his Red Deer studio in Munich, Germany. Because they were dissatisfied with the available digital synthesisers and samples, Pet Shop Boys wanted to use analogue synthesisers. Faltermeyer was chosen as a producer as he happened to be an expert on analogue equipment. The result was a Pet Shop Boys album that differed from both the previous album, Introspective, and the 1993 follow-up, Very. In places, the album expands upon the synth-pop genre with flavours of guitar pop ballads, as with "This Must Be the Place I Waited Years to Leave" and "My October Symphony" (a song about the decline of the Soviet Union) featuring guitarist Johnny Marr. Later, singer Neil Tennant would reflect on the different style of Behaviour: " It was more reflective and more musical-sounding, and also it probably didn't have irritatingly crass ideas in it, like our songs often do". Tennant stated the album was inspired by fellow synth-pop group Depeche Mode's album Violator, released that same year.

Singles
 "So Hard" (R 6269 – 24 September 1990)
The video was directed by Eric Watson. The b-side was "It Must Be Obvious", with the USA release also featuring the Italian Mix of "Paninaro", which was originally released on Disco. Remixes were by the Pet Shop Boys themselves, The KLF and David Morales. The KLF also remixed "It Must Be Obvious", which was only available on The KLF versus Pet Shop Boys CD and 12-inch of the single.
 "Being Boring" (R 6275 – 12 November 1990)
The video was directed by Bruce Weber. The B-side was "We All Feel Better in the Dark". There were Pet Shop Boys Extended Mixes of both a-side and b-side, and there was a remix of "Being Boring" by Marshall Jefferson and two remixes of the B-side by Brothers in Rhythm on a limited edition 12-inch and CD of the single.
 "How Can You Expect to Be Taken Seriously?" (E2-56205 – 1991) [US only]
The video was directed by Liam Kan. The single was radically remixed from the album version by Brothers in Rhythm, and this become the version on the double a-side released in the UK with "Where the Streets Have No Name (I Can't Take My Eyes Off You)". This US release featured the Techno Funk mix of "I Want a Dog", the Marshall Jefferson remix of "Being Boring" and the Trevor Horn 7-inch mix of "It's Alright". There were also remixes by David Morales, which were released on a limited edition 12-inch and CD. The single mix was not featured on either of the Pet Shop Boys' greatest hits albums (Discography: The Complete Singles Collection and Pop Art: Pet Shop Boys – The Hits), although the video was featured on the Pop Art DVD and Videography.
 "Where the Streets Have No Name (I Can't Take My Eyes Off You)" / "How Can You Expect to Be Taken Seriously?" (R 6285 – 11 March 1991)
The videos for both songs were directed by Liam Kan, which drew on iconography from the Pet Shop Boys' then current tour and featured Neil Tennant spoofing several 'rock' stars including U2, Bruce Springsteen, Elvis Presley and George Michael. There was an additional b-side, "Bet She's Not Your Girlfriend", and in addition to some extended mixes of both singles, there were additional remixes of both songs by David Morales.
 "Jealousy" (R 6283 – 27 May 1991)
The video was directed by Eric Watson. The b-side was the Pet Shop Boys' tidied-up demo version of "Losing My Mind", which they produced for Liza Minnelli in 1989 for her album Results. The single mix was more electronic than the version on the album, and there was an extended mix of "Jealousy" which featured Neil Tennant reading excerpts of Shakespeare's Othello, which is a play about jealousy. There was also a Disco Mix of "Losing My Mind". On the limited edition CD, an edit of the Extended Mix of "This Must Be the Place I Waited Years to Leave" (which was originally available with the Japanese version of Behaviour) was included along with David Morales' Red Zone mix of "So Hard". "Jealousy" was later covered by Dubstar. It is known to be one of Robbie Williams' favourite Pet Shop Boys songs, and he sang it with the duo for their 2006 Radio 2 concert, which was later released on the 2006 Pet Shop Boys' live album Concrete.

Critical reception

Reviewing Behaviour for Entertainment Weekly, Jim Farber commented that the album contained the Pet Shop Boys' "best tunes yet" and "their most consistently beautiful melodies to date", noting "an easier way with the beats and greater vulnerability in the lyrics" compared to the duo's prior material. Greg Kot of the Chicago Tribune stated that Behaviour "may strike some listeners as even wimpier and blander than earlier releases, but its subtle brilliance emerges with repeated plays", calling it "a record that'll seduce dance clubs for a few months, and haunt the stay-at-home crowd for long after." "Some of their dance fans may be a trifle disappointed", wrote Mark Cooper for Q, "but the best ballads here are as wry and touching as vintage Broadway. Frank Sinatra should be calling shortly." The magazine named Behaviour one of the 50 best albums of 1990. Robert Christgau selected "Being Boring" and "My October Symphony" as highlights in his Village Voice "Consumer Guide" column; he later gave the album a two-star honourable mention grade, indicating a "likable effort that consumers attuned to its overriding aesthetic or individual vision may well enjoy."

In a mixed review, NMEs Roger Morton conceded that Behaviour "is probably no more a disconsolate record than Introspective or Actually", but questioned its relative lack of "a defiant surge of rhythm". Robert Hilburn of the Los Angeles Times found that the album reaches "the emotional peaks" of the Pet Shop Boys' previous work on "peppy highlights" such as "So Hard" and "The End of the World", while "the occasional lapses and the forays into slower tempos" feel "flat by comparison".

In 1999, Q listed Behaviour as one of the 90 best albums of the 1990s, while critic Ned Raggett ranked it ninth on his list of "The Top 136 or So Albums of the Nineties" for Freaky Trigger. Behaviour is featured in the book 1001 Albums You Must Hear Before You Die.

Re-release
Along with the rest of the group's first six studio albums, Behaviour was re-released as Behaviour/Further Listening: 1990–1991 in 2001. The reissue was digitally remastered, and accompanied with a second disc of B-sides, and some previously unreleased songs, recorded from 1990 to 1991. Notable songs on the second disc include "Miserablism", "DJ Culture", "Was It Worth It?", and the Ambient Mix of "Music for Boys". "Miserablism", a poignant satire of Morrissey, was intended for inclusion on Behaviour up until the day it was sent for mastering. It later became the B-side to "Was It Worth It?" and was remixed by Moby for the 12-inch single; it was also featured on the limited edition version of the duo's 2003 compilation album PopArt: The Hits, in a remixed form. "DJ Culture" and "Was It Worth It?" were the two singles recorded for the Pet Shop Boys' 1991 compilation album, Discography: The Complete Singles Collection. "Music for Boys" was originally credited as "Music for Boys Part 2" and was the B-side to "DJ Culture". The original B-side version can also be found on the 1995 compilation album Alternative. This reissue was re-released in 2018 along with the Further Listening editions of Very and Bilingual.

Another re-release followed on 9 February 2009, under the title of Behaviour: Remastered. This version contains only the 10 tracks on the original.

Track listing

Notes
 Track 12 on the Further Listening 1990–1991 bonus disc is incorrectly labelled as "Music for Boys" (ambient mix).

Personnel

Behaviour
Credits adapted from the liner notes of Behaviour.

Pet Shop Boys
 Neil Tennant
 Chris Lowe

Additional musicians
 Dominic Clarke – additional programming ; plastic tube 
 J.J. Belle – guitar 
 Johnny Marr – rhythm guitar, feedback guitar ; guitar 
 Angelo Badalamenti – orchestra arrangement and conducting 
 Alexander Bălănescu – string quartet arrangement 
 Balanescu Quartet – strings 
 Jay Henry – additional vocals 

Technical
 Pet Shop Boys – production
 Harold Faltermeyer – production
 Brian Reeves – engineering
 Bob Kraushaar – engineering ; vocal recording 
 Julian Mendelsohn – mixing
 Haydn Bendall – orchestra recording, strings recording

Artwork
 Eric Watson – photography
 Mark Farrow – design
 Pet Shop Boys – design

Further Listening 1990–1991
Credits adapted from the liner notes of Introspective/Further Listening 1990–1991.

Pet Shop Boys
 Neil Tennant
 Chris Lowe

Additional musicians
 Dominic Clarke – additional programming ; programming ; sequencing 
 Gary Maughan – additional keyboards 
 Juliet Roberts – additional vocals 
 J.J. Belle – guitars 
 Tessa Niles – additional vocals 
 Harold Faltermeyer – orchestral arrangement 
 Scott Davidson – programming 
 Greg Bone – guitar 
 Pete Gleadall – programming 
 Andy Duncan – percussion 
 Carol Kenyon – additional vocals 
 Guida de Palma – additional vocals 

Technical
 Pet Shop Boys – production ; remix ; mixing ; compilation
 Pete Schwier – engineering ; mixing 
 Harold Faltermeyer – production 
 Brian Reeves – engineering 
 Julian Mendelsohn – mixing ; production 
 Bob Kraushaar – engineering 
 Paul Wright – engineering 
 David Jacob – remix ; mixing 
 Ren Swan – engineering 
 Steve Fitzmaurice – engineering assistance 
 Mike Jarratt – orchestra recording 
 Brothers in Rhythm – production ; mixing 
 Stephen Hague – mix, additional production 
 Chris Heath – compilation
 Tim Young – remastering

Artwork
 Derek Ridgers, the Douglas Brothers, Peter Calvin, George Hurrell, Sheila Rock, Pennie Smith – photographs
 John Huba – centrespread photograph
 Paul Rider – booklet cover photograph
 Eric Watson – album cover photographs

Charts

Weekly charts

Year-end charts

Certifications and sales

Notes

References

External links

 Behaviour (Adobe Flash) at Radio3Net (streamed copy where licensed)
 Behaviour (Adobe Flash) at Myspace (streamed copy where licensed)

1990 albums
Albums produced by Harold Faltermeyer
Parlophone albums
Pet Shop Boys albums